The 2013 Junior Oceania Cup was an international field hockey tournament hosted by Australia. The quadrennial tournament serves as the Junior Championship of Oceania organized by the Oceania Hockey Federation. It was held in Gold Coast, Queensland, Australia between 27 February and 3 March 2008.

Host nation Australia was joined by teams from, New Zealand, Papua New Guinea and Vanuatu.

Australia won the tournament in both the men's and women's competitions. The tournament also served as a qualifier for the 2013 men's and women's Junior World Cups, with both Australia and New Zealand qualifying to both.

Men's tournament

Results
All times are local (UTC+10).

Pool Stage

Classification Stage

Third and fourth place

Final

Women's tournament

Results
All times are local (UTC+10).

Pool

Matches

References

Junior Oceania Cup
International field hockey competitions hosted by Australia
Junior Oceania Cup
Sports competitions on the Gold Coast, Queensland
Oceania Cup
Junior Oceania Cup
Junior Oceania Cup